The first season of Dancing with the Stars debuted on ABC on June 1, 2005. Six celebrities were paired with six professional ballroom dancers. Tom Bergeron and Lisa Canning were the hosts for this season, while the judges were Carrie Ann Inaba, Len Goodman, and Bruno Tonioli.

The premiere drew over 13 million viewers, the second biggest summer debut ever for an American reality series after Survivor. The second week climbed to 15 million viewers, and the show climbed to No. 1 in the summer 2005 TV season ratings, where it remained for the remainder of the season.

The season finale aired July 6, 2005, where General Hospital actress Kelly Monaco and Alec Mazo were crowned the champions, while actor John O'Hurley and Charlotte Jørgensen finished in second place, and New Kids on the Block singer Joey McIntyre and Ashly DelGrosso finished in third.

Due to controversy over Kelly Monaco winning the coveted mirror ball trophy over the consistently high-scoring John O'Hurley, a special rematch episode was held on September 20, 2005, with the results announced on a September 22 telecast. This time, John O'Hurley and Charlotte Jørgensen were crowned the champions and sizable donations were made to Monaco and O'Hurley's chosen charities.

Cast

Couples
The six professionals and celebrities that competed were:

Future appearances
Kelly Monaco returned for the All-Stars season, where she was paired with Valentin Chmerkovskiy.

Scoring charts

Notes

 : This was the lowest score of the week.
 : This was the highest score of the week.
 :  This couple finished in first place.
 :  This couple finished in second place.
 :  This couple was in the bottom two, but was not eliminated.
 :  This couple was eliminated.

Highest and lowest scoring performances 
The highest and lowest performances in each dance according to the judges' 30-point scale are as follows.

Couples' highest and lowest scoring dances
Scores are based upon a potential 30-point maximum.

Weekly scores 
Individual judges' scores in the charts below (given in parentheses) are listed in this order from left to right: Carrie Ann Inaba, Len Goodman, Bruno Tonioli.

Week 1
Each couple performed either the cha-cha-cha or the waltz. Couples are listed in the order they performed.

Week 2
Each couple performed either the quickstep or the rumba. Couples are listed in the order they performed.

Week 3
Each couple performed either the jive or the tango. Couples are listed in the order they performed.

Week 4
Each couple performed the samba, as well as a group Viennese waltz. Couples are listed in the order they performed.

Week 5
Each couple performed both the foxtrot and the paso doble. Couples are listed in the order they performed.

Week 6: Finale
Each couple performed two dances, one of which was a freestyle. Couples are listed in the order they performed.

Week 7: Dance off (aka Rematch)

This was a special "rematch" broadcast, coming some time later (September 20, 2005, with the results announced on a September 22 telecast).

Dance chart
The celebrities and professional partners will dance one of these routines for each corresponding week:
 Week 1: One unlearned dance (cha-cha-cha or waltz)
 Week 2: One unlearned dance (quickstep or rumba)
 Week 3: One unlearned dance (jive or tango)
 Week 4: One unlearned dance (samba) & Viennese waltz group dance
 Week 5 (Semifinals): Two unlearned dances (foxtrot & paso doble) 
 Week 6 (Finals): One previously performed dance & freestyle 

Notes

 :  This was the highest scoring dance of the week.
 :  This was the lowest scoring dance of the week.
 :  This couple danced, but received no scores.

Ratings

References

External links

Dancing with the Stars (American TV series)
2005 American television seasons